Claire Wright is a British politician. She was a Devon county councillor from 2013 to 2021 and stood as an independent for East Devon in the 2015, 2017, and 2019 United Kingdom general elections, coming second each time.

Career
Wright started working in the National Health Service in a public relations role in 2001, served on the Ottery St Mary Town Council and was elected to Devon County Council in 2013 with 74 percent of the vote. She stood as a parliamentary candidate in the 2015, 2017, and 2019 elections, receiving increasing shares of the vote. Wright's main policy interests are the NHS, social care and preserving the environment, with her manifesto based on a community survey.

The East Devon constituency has only ever been held by the Conservative Party and used to be considered a safe seat. With growing support in the 2017 general election for Wright, polling indicated the seat had become marginal. Queen guitarist Brian May endorsed Wright in 2017, while actor Hugh Grant and reporter Martin Bell endorsed Wright at the 2019 election. However, in the December 2019 election, Wright lost to the Conservative Simon Jupp by nearly 7,000 votes. Asked by local radio if she would run again, Wright  was unsure. In 2021, she announced she would not stand in the 2021 County Council elections.

In Diary of an MP's Wife (2020), the memoirs of Sasha Swire, Wright is frequently referred to by the name "Claire Wrong".

After the resignation of Neil Parish, MP for Tiverton and Honiton, in May 2022, there were some suggestions that Wright would stand in the subsequent by-election. However, she clarified on a statement on Twitter that she would not put her name forward, instead endorsing the Liberal Democrats.

Personal life

Wright lives in Ottery St Mary in East Devon.

Electoral record

2019 general election

2017 general election

2015 general election

References

External links

"High hopes, tears and Hugh Grant: Claire Wright on almost pulling off the biggest upset of the 2019 General Election" from the Express & Echo

Living people
Year of birth missing (living people)
Independent British political candidates
Independent councillors in the United Kingdom
21st-century British politicians
21st-century British women politicians
People from Ottery St Mary